The following database management systems and other software use multiversion concurrency control.

Databases
 Altibase
 Berkeley DB
 Cloudant
 Cloud Spanner
 Clustrix
 CockroachDB
 Couchbase
 CouchDB
 CUBRID
 IBM Db2 – since IBM DB2 9.7 LUW ("Cobra") under CS isolation level – in currently committed mode
 Drizzle
 Druid
 etcd
 EXASOL
 eXtremeDB
 Firebird
 FLAIM
 FoundationDB
 GE Smallworld Version Managed Data Store
 H2 Database Engine – experimental since version 1.0.57 (2007-08-25)
 HBase
 HSQLDB – starting with version 2.0
 IBM Netezza
 Ingres
 InterBase – all versions
 LMDB and MDBX
 MariaDB (MySQL fork) – when used with XtraDB, an InnoDB fork and that is included in MariaDB sources and binaries or PBXT
 MarkLogic Server – a bit of this is described in
 MemSQL
 Microsoft SQL Server – when using READ_COMMITTED_SNAPSHOT, starting with SQL Server 2005
 MonetDB
 MongoDB – when used with the WiredTiger storage engine
 MySQL – when used with InnoDB, Falcon, or Archive storage engines
 NuoDB
 ObjectDB
 ObjectStore
 Oracle database – all versions since Oracle 4
 Oracle (née DEC) Rdb
 OrientDB
 PostgreSQL
 Postgres-XL
 RDM Embedded
 REAL Server
 Realm
 RethinkDB
 SAP HANA
 SAP IQ
 ScyllaDB
sones GraphDB
 Sybase SQL Anywhere
 TerminusDB
 TokuMX
 Actian Vector
 YugabyteDB
 Zope Object Database

Other software with MVCC
JBoss Cache – v 3.0
Ehcache – v 1.6.0-beta4
Clojure – language software transactional memory
Apache Jackrabbit Oak

References 

Databases using MVCC
Concurrency control algorithms